James Brown (5 May 1919 – 13 April 2005) was a Scottish amateur football outside left who played in the Scottish League for Queen's Park. He was capped by Scotland at amateur level.

References

Scottish footballers
Scottish Football League players
Queen's Park F.C. players
Association football outside forwards
Scotland amateur international footballers
1919 births
2005 deaths
Footballers from Glasgow